Valentina-Neli Ardean-Elisei (born 5 June 1982) is a Romanian handballer for Gloria Bistrița. Since 26 September 2019, she is retired from the Romanian national team.

She received a silver medal in the 2005 World Championship and was named left wing of the All-Star Team. She was again given this award in the 2008 European Championship and in the 2015 World Championship.

She was given the award of Cetățean de onoare ("Honorary Citizen") of the city of Craiova in 2018.

International honours
EHF Champions League:
Silver Medalist: 2010
Bronze Medalist: 2009, 2012
EHF Champions Trophy:
Winner: 2007
EHF Cup Winners' Cup:
Winner: 2007
EHF Cup:
Winner: 2018
EHF Challenge Cup:
Winner: 2002
World Championship:
Silver Medalist: 2005
Bronze Medalist: 2015
Junior European Championship:
Winner: 2000

Individual awards
 All-Star Left Wing of the World Championship: 2005
 All-Star Left Wing of the European Championship: 2008
 All-Star Left Wing of the World Championship: 2015
 EHF Cup Winners' Cup Top Scorer: 2007

References

External links

1982 births
Living people
Sportspeople from Focșani
Romanian female handball players
Handball players at the 2008 Summer Olympics
Handball players at the 2016 Summer Olympics
Olympic handball players of Romania
Expatriate handball players
Romanian expatriate sportspeople in Serbia
SCM Râmnicu Vâlcea (handball) players
CS Minaur Baia Mare (women's handball) players